Athymoris phreatosa is a moth in the family Lecithoceridae. It is found in China (Sichuan) and Taiwan.

The wingspan is about 17 mm. The species differs from related species by the dark brown ground colour and a white spot at the costal two-thirds.

References

Athymoris
Moths of Asia
Moths of Taiwan
Moths described in 1994